The 1947–48 Taça de Portugal was the ninth season of the Taça de Portugal (English: Portuguese Cup), the premier Portuguese football knockout competition, organized by the Portuguese Football Federation (FPF). The competition wansn't played in the previous season due to overscheduling with the creation of the Terceira Divisão. Sporting Clube de Portugal was defeated C.F. Os Belenenses in the final on 4 July 1948.

Participating Teams

Primeira Divisão 
(14 Teams)
Associação Académica de Coimbra – Organismo Autónomo de Futebol
Atlético Clube de Portugal
Clube de Futebol Os Belenenses
Sport Lisboa e Benfica
Sporting Clube de Braga
Boavista Futebol Clube
Grupo Desportivo Estoril Praia
Lusitano Futebol Clube "VRSA"
O Elvas Clube Alentejano de Desportos
Sporting Clube Olhanense
Futebol Clube do Porto
Sporting Clube de Portugal
Vitória Sport Clube "de Guimarães"
Vitória Futebol Clube "de Setúbal"

Segunda Divisão 
(10 Teams)
Futebol Clube Barreirense
Grupo Desportivo CUF "Barreiro"
Futebol Clube Famalicão
Leixões Sport Clube
Sport Grupo Scalabitano Os Leões "de Santarém"
Luso Sport Clube "Beja"
União Desportiva Oliveirense
Portimonense Sporting Clube
Sporting Clube da Covilhã
Clube de Futebol União de Coimbra

Terceira Divisão 
(4 Teams)
Clube Académico de Futebol "de Viseu"
Clube Desportivo Cova da Piedade
Clube Desportivo de Faro
Sport Clube União Torreense

Madeira Championship 
(1 Team)
Clube Sport Marítimo

First round

Results

First-round play-off

Results

Second round

Results

Quarterfinals

Results

Semifinals

Results

Final

References

External links
Official webpage 
1947–48 Taça de Portugal at zerozero.pt 

Taça de Portugal seasons
Port
Taca